Nick Isiekwe (born 20 April 1998) is an English professional rugby union player who plays as a lock or flanker for Premiership Rugby side Saracens.

Early life
Isiekwe was born in Hemel Hempstead.

Isiekwe first played rugby union at the age of six, playing touch rugby for Old Verulamians after being encouraged by his mother Ruth to take up a sport. At the age of thirteen, he played for Old Albanian RFC and went through the junior ranks at the club.

Club career
Isiekwe, a member of the Saracens Academy structure, was trialed at many positions including prop, Number 8, flanker and centre, but his six-foot six stature saw him physically outgrow his original positions and moved to second row. This positional change saw him gain two appearances for the Saracens senior side during the 2016–17 Premiership campaign.

In May 2018 Isiekwe started in the final of 2017–18 Premiership Rugby season as Saracens defeated Exeter Chiefs to win the competition. The following season he was a member of the side that completed a league and European double; coming off the bench as a replacement for Will Skelton in the 2019 European Rugby Champions Cup Final which saw Saracens defeat Leinster at St James' Park to become European champions and subsequently featuring in the victory over Exeter to retain their league title.

In May 2020 it was announced that Isiekwe had signed a new deal that would see him remain at Saracens until 2024. After Saracens were relegated to the RFU Championship for the 2020-21 campaign it was confirmed that he would further develop his career in the Premiership by spending a season on loan at Northampton Saints. In his first season back at Saracens he started in the Premiership final defeat to Leicester Tigers.

International career
At the age of fifteen, Isiekwe represented London and South East U16's district in 2014, which quickly saw him gain his first age-grade international call-up; playing for England under 16's against Wales and Scotland. He made a quick climb in the national age-grade set-up, representing England under 17's in 2015 and making three appearances at the 2015 European Under-18 Championship in France. He was a member of the England under-20 team that completed a grand slam during the 2017 Six Nations Under 20s Championship.

On 20 April 2017, Isiekwe received his first call-up by coach Eddie Jones for the senior England team to join their summer tour of South America. On 10 June 2017 he made his senior debut as a second-half substitute for Charlie Ewels in the opening test against Argentina. The following year he made his first start in the opening test of their summer tour against South Africa at Ellis Park however he was substituted in the first half. Isiekwe did not feature at international level again for four years until he was recalled for the 2022 Six Nations Championship. He was also a member of their 2022 tour of Australia featuring off the bench in the final test victory at Sydney Cricket Ground to win the series.

Honours
Saracens
 European Rugby Champions Cup: 2018-19
 Premiership: 2017-18, 2018-19

References

External links
 
 RFU Profile

1998 births
Living people
Black British sportspeople
England international rugby union players
English people of Nigerian descent
English rugby union players
Rugby union locks
Rugby union players from Hemel Hempstead
Northampton Saints players
Saracens F.C. players